Roger David Giles  is a former judge of the Court of Appeal of the Supreme Court of New South Wales, the highest court in the State of New South Wales, Australia, which forms part of the Australian court hierarchy. He retired as a Judge of Appeal on 23 December 2012.

Giles was educated at the University of Sydney and the University of Oxford.

References

Judges of the Supreme Court of New South Wales
Living people
University of Sydney alumni
Alumni of the University of Oxford
Year of birth missing (living people)
Australian King's Counsel